Pioneer Mother may refer to:

 The Pioneer Mother (Eugene, Oregon), an outdoor sculpture by Alexander Phimister Proctor, installed in Eugene, Oregon
 The Pioneer Mother Memorial, an outdoor 1928 memorial sculpture by Avard Fairbanks, installed in Vancouver, Washington
 Madonna of the Trail, statues located in 12 different states
 Pioneer Woman statue of pioneer mother and son in Ponca City, Oklahoma